María Sophia Vicente García (born 28 March 2001) is a Spanish athlete specialising in combined events and triple jump. She is the holder of the U18 World Best in pentathlon, as well as the senior Spanish national record in pentathlon and heptathlon.

International competitions

Personal bests
Outdoor
200 m: 23.03 s (+0.5 m/s)
Long jump: 6.54 m (-1.9 m/s)
Triple jump: 13.95 m (+1.1m/s)
Heptathlon: 6304 points NR
Heptathlon U18: 6221 points

Indoor
Long jump: 6.70 m
Triple jump: 13.71 m
Pentathlon: 4582 points NR
Pentathlon U18: 4371 points WR U18

Personal life
Vicente's father was born in Cuba, while her mother is from Huélamo, Cuenca, Castile-La Mancha.

References

External links
 
 
 
 

2001 births
Living people
Spanish people of Cuban descent
Sportspeople from L'Hospitalet de Llobregat
Athletes from Catalonia
Spanish heptathletes
Spanish pentathletes
Spanish female triple jumpers
Athletes (track and field) at the 2018 Summer Youth Olympics
Spanish Athletics Championships winners
World Youth Championships in Athletics winners
Athletes (track and field) at the 2020 Summer Olympics
Olympic athletes of Spain
21st-century Spanish women